In computational complexity theory,  is the set of all decision problems solvable by a deterministic Turing machine in exponential space, i.e., in  space, where  is a polynomial function of . Some authors restrict  to be a linear function, but most authors instead call the resulting class .

Formal definition 

Examples of problems 
An example of an  problem is the problem of recognizing whether two regular expressions represent different languages, where the expressions are limited to four operators: union, concatenation, the Kleene star (zero or more copies of an expression), and squaring (two copies of an expression).

If the Kleene star is left out, then that problem becomes , which is like , except it is defined in terms of non-deterministic Turing machines rather than deterministic.

Alur and Henzinger extended linear temporal logic with times (integer) and prove that the validity problem of their logic is EXPSPACE-complete.

The coverability problem for Petri Nets is -complete.

Relationship to other classes 

See also
Game complexity

References 

  Section 9.1.1: Exponential space completeness, pp. 313–317. Demonstrates that determining equivalence of regular expressions with exponentiation is EXPSPACE-complete.

Complexity classes